Lara Prašnikar (born 8 August 1998) is a Slovenian football striker playing for Eintracht Frankfurt in the German Frauen Bundesliga.

Career statistics

International 

Scores and results list Slovenia's goal tally first, score column indicates score after each Prašnikar goal.

Notes

References

External links 
 Lara Prašnikar at NZS
 

1998 births
Living people
Slovenian women's footballers
Women's association football forwards
Slovenia women's international footballers
Slovenian expatriate footballers
Slovenian expatriate sportspeople in Germany
Expatriate women's footballers in Germany
Frauen-Bundesliga players
1. FFC Turbine Potsdam players
Eintracht Frankfurt (women) players